The Circumflegrea railway (sometimes also known as Line 5) is a commuter railway line that connects Naples city centre with the northern Phlegraean Fields, a suburban area located west of the city. The line is operated by the Ente Autonomo Volturno (EAV) company.

History 
The line was projected in 1946 and works started in 1948.

The construction proceeded very slowly, and the first section (from Napoli Montesanto to Soccavo) was not opened until 1962; the railway was extended in 1968 to Marina di Licola; the last part was built but remained abandoned.

The complete railway was opened on 11 January 1986.

Projects 
Construction started of a new short branch between Soccavo and Monte Sant′Angelo, but has stopped due to the lack of funds.

Route

Service 
Trains run every 20 minutes between Montesanto and Licola; only a few trains continue to the terminus at Torregaveta.

According to a timetable posted in paper format at the station of Licola, all trains now (2018/11) end there.

See also 
 Metropolitana di Napoli
 List of suburban and commuter rail systems

References

Bibliography 
 Antonio Bertagnin: SEPSA in rinnovamento. In: ″TuttoTreno″ Nr. 150 (February 2002), p. 14–17.

External links 

Railway lines in Campania
Transport in Naples
Railway lines opened in 1963
Phlegraean Fields